Torre Bicentenario II was a proposed skyscraper that could be built at the corner of  Carretera Picacho-Ajusco and Periférico Sur, Tlalpan, in Mexico City. Proposed plans would make it the fourth tallest building in America, the tallest building in Mexico City,  Latin America and surpassing  Torre Mayor, the tallest building in Mexico at 225.6 m. Héctor Tagle Náder will be the architect.

Details

It is planned to have a height of 350 m with 77 stories and a total area of 350,000 m2.
It was planned to be finished in 2010 for Mexico's 200th anniversary of fighting for freedom from Spain.
Six underground levels
It will consist of a hotel, offices and a restaurant.
The tower will have an investment of approximately US$800 million which will be from private investment.
The high cost of this building is due to the security measures. It will be equipped with the latest technology in seismic shock absorbers due to the high seismic activity of the area.

References
Google Translation From Spanish About Both Torre Bicentenario Tower I&II.

Skyscrapers in Mexico City
Unbuilt buildings and structures in Mexico